TVR 2 (spelled out as Televiziunea Română 2, "Romanian Television 2") is the second channel of the public broadcaster TVR.

The channel was launched on May 2, 1968, but it was suspended from January 20, 1985, until February 19, 1990. From 2003, it has been a market leader in Romania with some very well thought television shows, such as Tonomatul DP2 and the British television series Doctor Who, but since 2015, it has been a general arts and culture channel.

The main news television program of the channel is Ora de ştiri ("News Hour"), which is aired daily at 6:00 PM Romanian time. Also, another news program broadcast on this channel, Telejurnal, is aired daily at 12:00 AM Romanian time on TVR 2, which used to be the main news program, until 3rd of October 2021.

The channel mainly airs cultural content since the shut down of TVR Cultural, movies, documentaries, and very rarely sport events.
The most popular shows are Câștigă România, which was moved to TVR 1 in 2022, Drag de România mea, a folk music show, hosted by Paul Surugiu-Fuego, Pescar Hoinar, a show about 2 guys fishing, and Ferma, where it shows everything about farm animals.

TVR 2 launched an HD simulcast on 3 November 2019, alongside the Romanian Television's flagship channel, TVR 1.

See also
Romanian Television

References

External links
tvr2.tvr.ro
facebook.com/fanTVR2

Eastern Bloc mass media
2
Television channels and stations established in 1968
Television stations in Romania